Meghna Chakrabarti is an American journalist and radio producer. She is the host of NPR's On Point. She was the long-time host for the Modern Love podcast (a collaboration between WBUR and The New York Times). She formerly hosted the WBUR local news program Radio Boston and was the primary fill-in host for Here & Now, produced by WBUR and distributed nationally by NPR.

Background 
She has a Bachelor of Science in Civil and Environmental Engineering from Oregon State University (1998), a Master of Science in Environmental Science and Risk Management from Harvard University (2001), and a Master of Business Administration - Finance Concentration (with an emphasis in Leadership and Organizational Change) from Boston University (2013). Born in Boston to Mumbai immigrant parents, as a child Chakrabarti's family relocated to Oregon where she was raised.

Awards 
She has received awards in reporting from the Associated Press and the Radio Television News Directors Association, and her WBUR team shared the 2016 award for General Excellence in Radio/Audio from the Asian American Journalists Association.

References

External links 

 Interview on Inkhouse

Oregon State University alumni
Living people
Harvard University alumni
Radio personalities from Boston
Boston University School of Management alumni
Year of birth missing (living people)
Journalists from Massachusetts
American people of Indian descent
American women journalists
NPR personalities